José Santos Salas Morales  (8 July 1888 – 16 October 1955) was a Chilean physician and politician. He was candidate for the presidential election of 1925, where he was defeated by Emiliano Figueroa.

Santos Salas was one of the leaders of the Social-Republican Union of the Wage Earners of Chile (USRACh), a party that brought together workers and their unions during the 1920s. The leftist movement emerged in parallel to the Communist Party.

He was appointed by the Government Junta of 1925 as Minister of Hygiene, Social Assistance and Welfare. He was Minister of Justice and Hygiene during the administration of Carlos Ibáñez del Campo in 1927. Salas was also Minister of Health of Gabriel González Videla in 1947.

Gonzalez Videla appointed him as mayor of Santiago in 1946, in a position he held until 1950.

See also
History of Chile
1925 Chilean presidential election
Social-Republican Union of the Wage Earners of Chile
Ministry of Health
Justice

Sources 

 Ramón Folch, Armando de. Biografías de Chilenos. Santiago: Ediciones UC.

1888 births
1955 deaths
People from Talca
20th-century Chilean physicians
Mayors of Santiago
Chilean Ministers of Health
Chilean Ministers of Justice
University of Chile alumni
Candidates for President of Chile